Music Supported Here is an awareness campaign launched in December 2009 by the British Musicians' Union. The campaign, which is for all musicians, aims to raise awareness of copyright within music. The MU believes that musicians should control the use and distribution of their music, and that consumers should respect the rights of musicians. 

The campaign has already attracted the support of Robbie Williams and Feargal Sharkey.

Supporting the campaign
Musicians can sign up to the campaign by writing the word 'MUSIC' (with the C as a copyright symbol), and posting the declaration, along with their name, to the MU. Full details can be found via the official Music Supported Here website.

External links
 MU official site.
 Music Supported Here  official site

British music industry